Benjamin "Ben" W. Johnson (birth unknown – death unknown) was a professional rugby league footballer who played in the 1910s.

Playing career

Challenge Cup Final appearances
Ben Johnson played , i.e. number 2, in Wakefield Trinity's 0-6 defeat by Hull F.C. in the 1914 Challenge Cup Final during the 1913–14 season at Thrum Hall, Halifax, in front of a crowd of 19,000.

Club career
Ben Johnson made his début for Wakefield Trinity during September 1912, he appears to have scored no drop-goals (or field-goals as they are currently known in Australasia), but prior to the 1974–75 season all goals, whether; conversions, penalties, or drop-goals, scored 2-points, consequently prior to this date drop-goals were often not explicitly documented, therefore '0' drop-goals may indicate drop-goals not recorded, rather than no drop-goals scored. In addition, prior to the 1949–50 season, the archaic field-goal was also still a valid means of scoring points.

References

British military personnel of World War I
English rugby league players
Place of birth missing
Place of death missing
Rugby league forwards
Rugby league wingers
Wakefield Trinity players
Year of birth missing
Year of death missing